Kishka may refer to:
 Kishka (food) or kishke, various types of sausage or stuffed intestine
 Samiylo Kishka (1530–1602), nobleman from Bratslav
 Intestine or Gut (zoology), in East Slavic languages, also used in English-language Yiddishisms
 Kishka (prison cell), a type of cell in Soviet political prisons
 Kyshka, Perm Krai, Russia

See also 
 Kichka
 Kiszka